Marumo Gallants is a South African football club based in Limpopo Province that plays in the PSL. They play in the DSTV Premiership after purchasing a PSL license status from Tshakuma Tsha Madzivhandila in during 2020–21 season.

First team squad

Updated 26 August 2022.

References 

Marumo Gallants F.C.
Soccer in South Africa